Kardeşlerim (My Siblings) is a Turkish television series starring Celil Nalçakan, Halit Özgür Sarı, Yiğit Koçak, Su Burcu Yazgı Coşkun, Onur Seyit Yaran and Aylin Akpınar. It premiered on ATV on February 20, 2021.

Synopsis 
The story revolves around Kadir, Ömer, Asiye and Emel, four siblings who lose their parents due to unfortunate circumstances and try to build their lives going  forward with each other's support. Despite their ups and downs, they are always there for each other. But soon the truth surrounding their parent's death slowly starts to unravel and nothing will remain the same.

Episodes

Cast and characters

Main
 Fadik Sevin Atasoy as Şengül Eren; Orhan's ex-wife, Oğulcan and Aybike's mother and Kadir, Asiye, Ömer and Emel's paternal aunt.
 Celil Nalçakan (2021) as Akif Atakul, Susan’s husband, Nebahat’s ex-husband, father to Doruk, Kaan and Melisa Atakul. Step father to Harika. Murderer of Hatice and Veli Eren.
 Su Burcu Yazgı Coşkun (2021) as Asiye Eren; daughter of Hatice & Veli Eren, Ömer's twin, Kadir and Emel’s sister who is  caring and honest and acts as a supporting pillar for her brothers and sister at all times, Doruk's girlfriend.
 Yiğit Koçak (2021) as Ömer Eren; adopted son of Hatice & Veli Eren, Kadir & Emel’s adopted brother, Asiye's adopted twin, the younger Eren brother who tries to stand up for his siblings while also trying to ease the responsibilities shouldered by his elder brother Kadir, in any way he can. Süsen's boyfriend. Biological child of Susan Manyasali. Step brother of Harika.
 Aylin Akpınar (2021) as Emel Eren; daughter of Hatice & Veli Eren, the youngest of the Eren siblings. She is a sweet girl who loves her siblings unconditionally but hides away the longing for her parents deep in her heart.
 Onur Seyit Yaran as Doruk Atakul; son of Akif and Nebahat Atakul, elder brother of Melisa, Step brother of Kaan, Asiye's boyfriend.
Melis Minkari as Aybike Eren; daughter of Şengül and Orhan, younger sister of Oğulcan, cousin of Ömer, Asıye, Emel and Kadır. Berk’s girlfriend.
Recep Usta as Berk Özkaya; Doruk's best friend, Resul and Ayla's son, Aybike's boyfriend.
Cihan Şimşek as Oğulcan Eren; son of Şengül and Orhan, elder brother of Aybike, ex-boyfriend of Harika. Cousın to Kadir, Ömer, Asiye, Emel.

Recurring
Cüneyt Mete as Orhan Eren; Şengül's ex-husband, Veli's brother, Oğulcan and Aybike's father and Kadir, Asiye, Ömer and Emel's paternal uncle.
Simge Selçuk as Nebahat Atakul; Akif's ex-wife, Doruk and Melisa's mother. 
Ahu Yağtu as Suzan Manyaslı; Kenan's widow, Harika's mother, Ömer's biological mother and Akif's wife.  
Lizge Cömert as Süsen Kılıç; Harika's friend, Kadir's ex-girlfriend, Ömer's love interest.
Berk Ali Çatal as Tolga Barçın, Ayşe and Cemile’s ex-boyfriend.
Nazli Çetin as Leyla Barçın, Tolga’s sister.
Kaan Çakır as Ahmet Yılmaz, Ömer's biological father.
Nihan Büyükağaç as Şevval Yilmaz; Ahmet's wife, Yasmin and Sarp's mother.
Eylül Lize Kandemir as Yasmin Yilmaz; Ahmet and Şevval's daughter, Sarp's sister, Ömer's half-sister.
Atakan Ozkaya as Sarp Yilmaz; Ahmet and Şevval's son, Yasmin's brother, Ömer's half-brother.
Ecem Sena Bayir as Afra, Gönül's daughter
Emre Yetek as Burak, Ataman College principal.
Bariș Aksavaș as Ismail

Departed

Production 
The series was renewed for a third season, with the its first episode premiering on 3 September 2022.

References

External links
 

2021 Turkish television series debuts
Turkish romance television series
Turkish drama television series